Dolan Springs is an unincorporated community and census-designated place (CDP) in Mohave County, Arizona, United States. The population was 1,989 at the 2020 census, down from 2,033 at the 2010 census.

Geography
Dolan Springs is located in north-central Mohave County at  (35.615835, -114.260804). U.S. Route 93 forms the western boundary of the community, which extends northeast across Detrital Valley and into a smaller valley between the Cerbat Mountains to the south and Table Mountain Plateau to the north. US 93 leads southeast  to Kingman, the Mohave county seat, and northwest  to Boulder City, Nevada.

Demographics

As of the census of 2020, there were 1,734 people living in the CDP, for a population density of 29.8 people per square mile (11.5/km2). There were 1,320 housing units, of which 837, or 63.4%, were occupied. The racial makeup of the CDP was 76.7% White, 0.8% Black or African American, 1.4% Native American, 0.8% Asian, 0.3% Pacific Islander, 7.3% from some other race, and 12.6% from two or more races. 20.1% of the population were Hispanic or Latino of any race.

According to the U.S. Census American Community Survey, for the period 2016–2020 the estimated median annual income for a household in the CDP was $28,292, and the median income for a family was $47,821. About 41% of the population were living below the poverty line, including 88% of those under age 18 and 12% of those age 65 or over. About 25% of the population were employed, and 14% of the population had a bachelor's degree or higher.

Emergency services
EMS response in the Dolan Springs area can take hours. The Lake Mohave Ranchos Fire District LMRFD has one ambulance that covers 2200 square miles of Mohave County. The LMRFD ambulance covers the first 50 miles of US93 from milepost one at Hoover Dam to milepost 50 near Dolan springs, and from the Hualapai Indian reservation to the Nevada Arizona border at the Colorado River.

The LMRFD has a couple volunteer firefighters with no emergency medical training and two paid firefighter EMT's who are first out for fire protection, but also drive the ambulance, at times creating an either-or-or-situation.

The section of US Route 93 in Arizona was ranked as the most dangerous highway in the U.S. This 200-mile-long road runs between Wickenburg, Arizona, and the Hoover Dam Bypass Bridge, also known as the Mike O'Callaghan–Pat Tillman Memorial Bridge, near Nevada's border. Many drivers use this route when driving between Las Vegas and Phoenix. Most of the fatal crashes occur along the segment in Mohave County, Arizona. Overall, 70 fatal crashes reportedly took place on this highway from 2010–2016.

Recent changes to the intersection of US93 and Pierce Ferry, the road to the Grand Canyon West, and the addition of several truck stops on US93 North of Dolan Springs have made the highway far more dangerous. Slow speed trucks entering and crossing US93 create a situation ripe for high-speed crashes. In 2022 there have been several fatal crashes between milepost-1 and milepost-50 on US93.

Response Times
Response times can be long in the LMRFD, at times taking hours for EMS to arrive. If the LMRFD is responding to a call in Meadview when you have an accident near Hover Dam, it can take over four hours for EMS to arrive. 
It would take 40 minutes for the LMRFD ambulance to respond to the call in Meadview, another 20 minutes to assess and load the patient, an hour to transport the patient to the hospital in Kingman, and 20 minutes to unload the patient. Once they clear the hospital it would take an hour to respond to your accident near Hoover Dam, 20-40 minutes on-scene, and an hour to transport you to the hospital in Kingman. The total time to transport you to the definitive care of a physician is 4 hours and 50 minutes. Medical helicopters do respond to accidents on US93, but protocols don't allow them to transport a patient until a firefighter from the LMRFD arrives and assesses the patient.

Average Response Times
Emergency medical service units average more than 14 minutes in rural settings, with nearly 1 of 10 encounters waiting almost a half hour for the arrival of EMS personnel. Longer EMS response times have been associated with worse outcomes in trauma patients. NOTE The study excluded all encounters with arrival times 120 minutes or longer as these outliers were not representative of the general EMS experience. Some LMRFD EMS calls would have been excluded under these criteria.

Problems within the LMRFD going from six advanced life support ambulances and many volunteers to one ambulance and a handful of volunteers, but still covering 2200 Square Miles Blog Life and Death in Dolan Springs the Lake Mohave Ranchos Fire District

See also

 List of census-designated places in Arizona

References

Census-designated places in Mohave County, Arizona